Bamboo partridges, sometimes called ridge partridges, are medium-sized non-migratory birds of the genus Bambusicola in the family Phasianidae.They have a wide native distribution throughout Asia. They were formerly grouped in the Perdicinae subfamily of the Phasianidae (pheasants, quail, etc.). However, molecular research suggests that partridges are not a distinct taxon within the family Phasianidae, but that some species are closer to the pheasants, while others are closer to the junglefowl. Phylogenetic evidence supports the bamboo partridges as being the sister genus to the junglefowl.

Species
There are three species in the genus:

References

 
Bird genera
Taxonomy articles created by Polbot